The 2004 Women's One-Day Internationals Asia Cup is the inaugural edition of the Asian Cricket Council Women's One Day International cricket tournament. The two teams which took part in the tournament were India and Sri Lanka. It was held between 17 April and 29 April 2004, in Sri Lanka. The matches were played at the Sinhalese Sports Club Ground and Kandy Cricket Club. India won the inaugural edition against Sri Lanka 5–0.

Squads

Match summary

 Sri Lanka won the toss and elected to field.

 India won the toss and elected to bat.

 Sri Lanka won the toss and elected to bat.
 Kodupulle Indrani (Sri Lanka) made her ODI debut.

 Sri Lanka won the toss and elected to bat.
 Chamari Polgampola (Sri Lanka) made her ODI debut.

 Sri Lanka won the toss and elected to field.

References

External links
 Cricinfo tournament page

2004
2004 in Indian cricket
2004 in Sri Lankan cricket
International cricket competitions in 2004
Sri Lankan cricket seasons from 2000–01
International women's cricket competitions in Sri Lanka
2004 in women's cricket
April 2004 sports events in Asia